Alabaster Box is an Australian Christian pop rock band formed in the Gold Coast, Queensland, now based in the United States. The band originated at Christian Community Church in Burleigh Waters. The band became a full-time music ministry at the beginning of 2000. Since then, Alabaster Box has won awards, delivered singles to Australian Christian Radio and toured in Australia, New Zealand, England and the United States.

Members
 Naarah Seagrott: Vocals
 Brett Seagrott: Guitars

Former members
 Joshua Brown: Keyboards & Programming
 Matt Smallbone: Bass
 Sam Hatch: Acoustic Guitar
 Ben Woodward: Drums

Discography

"Alabaster Box" - 1998
"Show Me" EP - 2000
"Main Attraction" - 2001
"Love On The Radio" - 2004
"Live at Ripley Road DVD" - 2006
"We Will Not Be Silent" - 2008

Singles
For much of 2004 and continuing into 2005, Alabaster Box was in the top three 'most played Christian evangelist artists' in the country and has held down the number one spot for highest independent album sales in the same category.

2009 "Fearlessly Stumble" #1 on TRAA and Rock Across Australia Charts
2008 "New York" #1 for 9 consecutive weeks TRAA & Rock Across Australia Charts
2008 "We Will Not Be Silent" #1 for 12 consecutive weeks TRAA & Rock Across Australia Charts
2004 "Love on the Radio" #1 TRAA RadioActive Song (MAY)
2004 "Love on the Radio" #1 HOT 25 COUNTDOWN
2004 "There's Hope" #1 Most Played Independent Song by Australasian Artist on Australian Christian Radio
2004 "There's Hope" #1 for 8 consecutive weeks TRAA & Rock Across Australia Charts TOP 30
2001 "Main Attraction" #1 TRAA RadioActive Song (Sept)
2001 "It's Beginning Today" #2 TRAA RadioActive Artist
2001 "It's Beginning Today" #1 TRAA RadioActive Australasian Song and Artist
2001 "Carry On" #2 TRAA RadioActive Australasian Song
2000 "Show Me" (single) #1 TRAA RadioActive Australasian Song (Oct)

Tours
Alabaster Box play approximately 200 shows a year in schools, churches, youth groups, festivals and concerts.

Mainstage Slots:
 Australian Gospel Music Festival (Aust)
 Ichthus Festival (USA)
 Sonfest (Aust)
 Black Stump (Aust)
 Forest Edge Festival (Aust)
 Saltbush Festival (Aust)
 Parachute Music Festival (New Zealand)
 Easterfest (formerly the Australian Gospel Music Festival) (Australia) 2008
 Samstock Music Festival (New Zealand) 2008
 Australian tour with Newsboys - 2008

Alabaster Box has travelled extensively throughout Australia, and has undertaken ten tours of New Zealand, six of the US and one in England.

Awards
2004 Australian Gospel Music Awards
 Best Music- 'There's Hope”

2003 Johnny Dennis Music Award
 Best Popular Song- “There's Hope”

2004 Music Oz Awards
 Best Gospel Song- Runner up

1999 QLD Recording Industry Awards
 Best Pop Album
 Best Gospel Album
 Best Engineer

1998 96Five FM Creative Challenge
 Best Song

External links
 Official website
 Official Myspace

Queensland musical groups
Musicians from Gold Coast, Queensland
Australian Christian musical groups